Darreh Charm (also Romanized as Darreh-ye Charm; also known as Dar-i-Charm) is a village in Miyandasht Rural District, in the Central District of Darmian County, South Khorasan Province, Iran. At the 2006 census, its population was 581, in 123 families.

References 

Populated places in Darmian County